The Australian Grand Masters is a darts tournament that has been held since 1974.

List of tournaments

Men's

Ladies

Tournament records
 Most wins 6:  Russell Stewart. 
 Most Finals 6:  Russell Stewart.
 Most Semi-finals 7:  Russell Stewart. 
 Most Quarter-finals 9:  Russell Stewart. 
 Most Appearances 11:  Russell Stewart. 
 Most Prize Money won £5,175:  Ross Montgomery.
 Best winning average (92.67) :  Tony David v's  Peter Phillips, 2007 Quarter-final.
 Youngest Winner age 26:   Russell Stewart.
 Oldest Winner age 47:  Steve Duke.

References

External links
 Darts Australia
 Darts Australia/Grand Prix/Tournament/Australian Grand Masters

1974 establishments in Australia
Darts tournaments
Sports competitions in Australia
Darts in Australia